Primary myelofibrosis (PMF) is a rare bone marrow blood cancer. It is classified by the World Health Organization (WHO) as a type of myeloproliferative neoplasm, a group of cancers in which there is growth of abnormal cells in the bone marrow. This is most often associated with a somatic mutation in the JAK2, CALR, or MPL gene markers. In PMF, the healthy marrow is replaced by scar tissue (fibrosis), resulting in a lack of production of normal blood cells. Symptoms include anemia, increased infection and an enlarged spleen (splenomegaly).

In 2016, prefibrotic primary myelofibrosis was formally classified as a distinct condition that progresses to overt PMF in many patients, the primary diagnostic difference being the grade of fibrosis.

Signs and symptoms
The primary feature of primary myelofibrosis is bone marrow fibrosis, but it is often accompanied by:
 Abdominal fullness related to an enlarged spleen (splenomegaly).
 Bone pain
 Bruising and easy bleeding due to inadequate numbers of platelets
 Cachexia (loss of appetite, weight loss, and fatigue)
 Enlargement of both the liver and spleen
 Fatigue
 Fevers
 Chills
 Weight loss
 Gout and high uric acid levels
 Increased susceptibility to infection, such as pneumonia
 Pallor and shortness of breath due to anemia
 In rarer cases, a raised red blood cell volume
 Cutaneous myelofibrosis is a rare skin condition characterized by dermal and subcutaneous nodules.

Causes

The underlying cause of PMF is unknown (idiopathic disease). There is an association between mutations to the JAK2, CALR, or MPL gene and myelofibrosis. Approximately 90% of those with myelofibrosis have one of these mutations and 10% carry none of these mutations. These mutations are not specific to myelofibrosis, and are linked to other myeloproliferative neoplasms, specifically polycythemia vera and essential thrombocythemia.

The V617F mutation to the JAK2 protein is found in approximately half of individuals with primary myelofibrosis. The V617F mutation is a change of valine to phenylalanine at the 617 position. Janus kinases (JAKs) are non-receptor tyrosine kinases essential for the activation of signaling that is mediated by cytokine receptors lacking catalytic activity. These include receptors for erythropoietin, thrombopoietin, most interleukins and interferon. JAK2 mutations are significant because JAK2 plays a role in controlling production of blood cells from hematopoietic stem cells. The V617F mutation appears to make hematopoietic cells more sensitive to growth factors that need JAK2 for signal transduction, which include erythropoietin and thrombopoietin.

The MPL gene codes for a protein that acts as a receptor for thrombopoietin. A mutation in that gene, known as a W515 mutation, leads to the production of an abnormal thrombopoietin receptor protein, which results in the overproduction of abnormal megakaryocytes. The abnormal megakaryocytes stimulate other cells, the fibroblasts, to produce collagen in the bone marrow, by secreting PDGF and TGF-β1.

Mechanism
Myelofibrosis is a clonal neoplastic disorder of hematopoiesis, the formation of blood cellular components. It is one of the myeloproliferative disorders, diseases of the bone marrow in which excess cells are produced at some stage. Production of cytokines such as fibroblast growth factor by the abnormal hematopoietic cell clone (particularly by megakaryocytes) leads to replacement of the hematopoietic tissue of the bone marrow by connective tissue via collagen fibrosis. The decrease in hematopoietic tissue impairs the patient's ability to generate new blood cells, resulting in progressive pancytopenia, a shortage of all blood cell types. However, the proliferation of fibroblasts and deposition of collagen is a secondary phenomenon, and the fibroblasts themselves are not part of the abnormal cell clone.

In primary myelofibrosis, progressive scarring, or fibrosis, of the bone marrow occurs, for the reasons outlined above. The result is extramedullary hematopoiesis, i.e. blood cell formation occurring in sites other than the bone marrow, as the hemopoietic cells are forced to migrate to other areas, particularly the liver and spleen. This causes an enlargement of these organs. In the liver, the abnormal size is called hepatomegaly. Enlargement of the spleen is called splenomegaly, which also contributes to causing pancytopenia, particularly thrombocytopenia and anemia. Another complication of extramedullary hematopoiesis is poikilocytosis, or the presence of abnormally shaped red blood cells.

Myelofibrosis can be a late complication of other myeloproliferative disorders, such as polycythemia vera, and less commonly, essential thrombocythemia. In these cases, myelofibrosis occurs as a result of somatic evolution of the abnormal hematopoietic stem cell clone that caused the original disorder. In some cases, the development of myelofibrosis following these disorders may be accelerated by the oral chemotherapy drug hydroxyurea.

Sites of hematopoiesis
The principal site of extramedullary hematopoiesis in myelofibrosis is the spleen, which is usually markedly enlarged, sometimes weighing as much as 4000 g. As a result of massive enlargement of the spleen, multiple subcapsular infarcts often occur in the spleen, meaning that due to interrupted oxygen supply to the spleen partial or complete tissue death happens. On the cellular level, the spleen contains red blood cell precursors, granulocyte precursors and megakaryocytes, with the megakaryocytes prominent in their number and in their bizarre shapes. Megakaryocytes are believed to be involved in causing the secondary fibrosis seen in this condition, as discussed under "Mechanism" above. Sometimes unusual activity of the red blood cells, white blood cells, or platelets is seen. The liver is often moderately enlarged, with foci of extramedullary hematopoiesis. Microscopically, lymph nodes also contain foci of hematopoiesis, but these are insufficient to cause enlargement.

There are also reports of hematopoiesis taking place in the lungs. These cases are associated with hypertension in the pulmonary arteries.

The bone marrow in a typical case is hypercellular and diffusely fibrotic. Both early and late in disease, megakaryocytes are often prominent and are usually dysplastic.

Diagnosis
Epidemiologically, the disorder usually develops slowly and is mainly observed in people over the age of 50.

Diagnosis is made on the basis of bone marrow biopsy. Fibrosis grade 2 or 3 defines overt PMF whereas grade 0 or 1 defines prefibrotic primary myelofibrosis.

A physical exam of the abdomen may reveal enlargement of the spleen, the liver, or both.

Blood tests are also used in diagnosis. Primary myelofibrosis can begin with a blood picture similar to that found in polycythemia vera or chronic myeloid leukemia. Most people with myelofibrosis have moderate to severe anemia. Eventually thrombocytopenia, a decrease of blood platelets develops. When viewed through a microscope, a blood smear will appear markedly abnormal, with presentation of pancytopenia, which is a reduction in the number of all blood cell types: red blood cells, white blood cells, and platelets. Red blood cells may show abnormalities including bizarre shapes, such as teardrop-shaped cells, and nucleated red blood cell precursors may appear in the blood smear (leukoerythroblastic reaction). Normally, mature red blood cells in adults do not have a cell nucleus, and the presence of nucleated red blood cells suggests that immature cells are being released into the bloodstream in response to a very high demand for the bone marrow to produce new red blood cells. Immature white cells and platelets (large megakaryocytes) are also seen in blood samples, and basophil counts are increased. When late in the disease progression an attempt is made to take a sample of bone marrow by aspiration, it may result in a dry tap, meaning that where the needle can normally suck out a sample of semi-liquid bone marrow, it produces no sample because the marrow has been replaced with collagen fibers. A bone marrow biopsy will reveal collagen fibrosis, replacing the marrow that would normally occupy the space.

Treatment

The one known curative treatment is allogeneic stem cell transplantation, but this approach involves significant risks.
Other treatment options are largely supportive, and do not alter the course of the disorder (with the possible exception of ruxolitinib, as discussed below). These options may include regular folic acid, allopurinol or blood transfusions. Dexamethasone, alpha-interferon and hydroxyurea (also known as hydroxycarbamide) may play a role.

Lenalidomide and thalidomide may be used in its treatment, though peripheral neuropathy is a common troublesome side-effect.

Frequent blood transfusions may also be required. If the patient is diabetic and is taking a sulfonylurea, this should be stopped periodically to rule out drug-induced thrombocytopenia.

Splenectomy is sometimes considered as a treatment option for patients with myelofibrosis in whom massive splenomegaly is contributing to anaemia because of hypersplenism, particularly if they have a heavy requirement for blood transfusions. However, splenectomy in the presence of massive splenomegaly is a high-risk procedure, with a mortality risk as high as 3% in some studies.

In November 2011, the U.S. Food and Drug Administration (FDA) approved ruxolitinib (Jakafi) as a treatment for intermediate or high-risk myelofibrosis. Ruxolitinib serves as an inhibitor of JAK 1 and 2.
The New England Journal of Medicine (NEJM) published results from two Phase III studies of ruxolitinib. These data showed that the treatment significantly reduced spleen volume, improved symptoms of myelofibrosis, and was associated with much improved overall survival rates compared to placebo. However, the beneficial effect of ruxolitinib on survival has been recently questioned.

In August 2019, the FDA approved fedratinib (Inrebic) as a treatment for adults with intermediate-2 or high-risk primary or secondary (post-polycythemia vera or post-essential thrombocythemia) myelofibrosis (MF).

In March 2022, the FDA approved pacritinib (Vonjo) with an indication to treat adults who have intermediate or high-risk primary or secondary myelofibrosis and who have platelet (blood clotting cells) levels below 50,000/µL.

History
Myelofibrosis was first described in 1879 by Gustav Heuck. Eponyms for the disease are Heuck-Assmann disease or Assmann's Disease, for Herbert Assmann, who published a description under the term "osteosclerosis" in 1907.

It was characterised as a myeloproliferative condition in 1951 by William Dameshek.

The disease was also known as myelofibrosis with myeloid metaplasia and agnogenic myeloid metaplasia The World Health Organization utilized the name chronic idiopathic myelofibrosis until 2008, when it adopted the name of primary myelofibrosis.

In 2016, the WHO revised their classification of myeloproliferative neoplasms to define Prefibrotic primary myelofibrosis as a distinct clinical entity from overt PMF.

References

External links 

Myeloid neoplasia
Rare cancers
Idiopathic diseases